Protein Wnt-16 is a protein that in humans is encoded by the WNT16 gene. It has been proposed that stimulation of WNT16 expression in nearby normal cells is responsible for the development of chemotherapy-resistance in cancer cells.

Function 

The WNT gene family consists of structurally related genes that encode secreted signaling proteins. These proteins have been implicated in oncogenesis and in several developmental processes, including regulation of cell fate and patterning during embryogenesis. This gene is a member of the WNT gene family. It contains two transcript variants diverging at the 5' termini. These two variants are proposed to be the products of separate promoters and not to be splice variants from a single promoter. They are differentially expressed in normal tissues, one of which (variant 2) is expressed at significant levels only in the pancreas, whereas another one (variant 1) is expressed more ubiquitously with highest levels in adult kidney, placenta, brain, heart, and spleen.

WNT16B expression is regulated by nuclear factor of κ light polypeptide gene enhancer in B cells 1 (NF-κB) after DNA damage, as can occur to normal cells during radiation or chemotherapy. Subsequently WNT16B signals in a paracrine manner to activate the Wnt expression program in tumor cells. The expression of WNT16B in the tumor microenvironment attenuates the effects of cytotoxic chemotherapy in vivo, promoting tumor cell survival and disease progression. This implies a mechanism by which cycles of genotoxic therapy might enhance subsequent treatment resistance in the tumor microenvironment.

Model organisms
Model organisms have been used in the study of WNT16 function. A conditional knockout mouse line called Wnt16tm2b(EUCOMM)Wtsi was generated at the Wellcome Trust Sanger Institute. Male and female animals underwent a standardized phenotypic screen to determine the effects of deletion. Additional screens performed:  - In-depth immunological phenotyping - in-depth bone and cartilage phenotyping

References

Further reading